HYG may refer to:

 IATA code for Hydaburg Seaplane Base
Hooghly Ghat railway station
 Hygienic behavior in beekeeping, see Varroa sensitive hygiene